Roger Pope & Partners is a London optician with a Royal Warrant from Queen Elizabeth II.

History 
Roger Pope opened his own practice on New Cavendish Street in 1987, after working as an optician on nearby Harley Street for 20 years. He was dispensing prescriptions from the leading Harley Street Ophthalmologists. He was joined in partnership in 1997 by Stephen Hopkinson, and in 1996 opened a second store in Dulwich Village.

In 2006, after they had supplied her with eyewear for 5 years, Queen Elizabeth II granted a Royal Warrant to Roger Pope & Partners as her opticians.

References

External links 
 Homepage of Roger Pope & Partners

British Royal Warrant holders
Eyewear retailers of the United Kingdom
Eyewear companies of the United Kingdom